Thauria or the junglekings is a genus of butterflies in the family Nymphalidae. The genus ranges from Burma to Borneo. The butterflies are large and brightly coloured on the dorsal surface. There is a transverse white stripe on the forewing and one or two white apical spots. The hindwing has a broad yellow margin. The ventral wing surfaces are disruptively patterned and look like dead leaves, allowing the butterflies to blend into leaf litter on the forest floor. Cryptic ventral patterns have arisen multiple times in various forest-floor dwelling groups of Nymphalidae.

Species
Thauria aliris (Westwood, [1858])
Thauria lathyi (Fruhstorfer, 1902)

References

External links
Images representing Thauria at EOL
Images representing Thauria at BOLD

Morphinae
Nymphalidae genera
Taxa named by Frederic Moore